Gleb Vasilyevich Plaksin (21 November 2008) was a French-born Soviet and Russian film actor and musician.

Biography
Gleb Plaksin was born in Lyon, France where his Russian family settled down following the Russian Civil War. His father Vasily Stepanovich Plaksin was a Russian nobleman from Nizhny Novgorod who served as an officer in the hussar regiment of the Imperial Russian Army. His mother Nadezhda Damianovna Plaksina (née Snitko, 1899—1949) (ru) was a Sister of Charity from Saint Petersburg. Her elder brother Ivan Snitko (1896—1981) (ru) would become a decorated Soviet counter admiral. Also, according to Gleb, his maternal grandmother was a close relative of Henryk Sienkiewicz. Both of his parents took part in the World War I during which Nadezhda Snitko was awarded the Order of St. George of three classes. They met at a hospital in Simferopol and married. Later they also took part in the civil war together, but had to leave Russia for France.

Gleb studied music at the Conservatoire de Paris and became a professional piano player. After the Nazi invasion of France he became a member of the French Resistance. The multilingual teenager fought as a member of the American army after the Allies finally landed in France in 1944. After the war he continued his musical career.

In 1955 Gleb and his father immigrated to the Soviet Union. He worked as a pianist in Leningrad and then — as a radio presenter at the international department of Gosteleradio in Moscow. He also became known for his various roles in the Soviet cinema. He also took part in dubbing (over 200 foreign movies).

Plaksin was awarded the title of Honoured Artist of the Russian Federation in 2001. In 2003 he starred in the Russian action film White Gold.

He died in 2008 and was buried at the Vostryakovo Cemetery in Moscow.

He was decorated as a Resistance member, soldier, and actor by the Soviet Union, the Russian Federation, the United States, and France; his recognition included the Croix de Guerre, the French decoration awarded for military heroism.

Selected filmography
The Secret Agent's Blunder (1968) — chief of the foreign intelligence agency
The Adjutant of His Excellency (1969) — French general
The Red Tent (1969) — reporter
The Secret Agent's Fate (1970) — chief of the foreign intelligence agency
The Crown of the Russian Empire, or Once Again the Elusive Avengers (1971) — restaurant visitor
Monologue (1972) — foreign attendant at a congress
Charodei (1982) — member of the academic council
Mother (1990) — judge
Chernobyl: The Final Warning (1991) — Hammer's Assistant
Quiet Flows the Don (1992-2006) — foreigner
The Russian Singer (1993) — general Pannyukov
Bram Stoker's Burial of the Rats (1995) — Mr. Stoker (as Eduard Plaxin)
Hellfire (1995) — Henri
Secrets of Palace coup d'etat (2003) — Khrizologus
White Gold (2003) — academician

References

External links

1925 births
2008 deaths
United States Army personnel of World War II
Chevaliers of the Légion d'honneur
Conservatoire de Paris alumni
Honored Artists of the Russian Federation
Recipients of the Croix de Guerre 1939–1945 (France)
French emigrants to the Soviet Union
French musicians
French people of Russian descent
French Resistance members
Musicians from Lyon
Russian male film actors
Russian musicians
Soviet male film actors
Soviet musicians
20th-century French musicians